Hassan-Bengaluru section belongs to Bangalore division of South Western Railway Zone.

History
The rail line from Hassan to Bangalore via Shravanabelagola, Kunigal, Nelamangala was announced in Railway Budget 1996. Later the work was started in the year 1998. There are two sections in this line. One is from Hassan to Shravanabelagola and the second one is from Shravanabelagola to Nelamangala and Bengaluru.

Inaugural
A goods trial run was completed by 7 January 2006. The line was opened to traffic by 31 January 2006. Special trains were introduced on this line during Mahamastakabhisheka festival in 2006.

Stations on this Line

References

Rail transport in Karnataka
5 ft 6 in gauge railways in India